The R300 or Kuils River Freeway (also Cape Flats Freeway) is a Regional Route in the Cape Metropole, South Africa that connects Mitchells Plain with the N2, Kuils River, and the N1 at Bellville. The R300 is a freeway for its entire length; it forms part of the proposed Peninsula Expressway.

Route
The R300 begins at the Stellenberg Interchange with the N1 between Bellville and Brackenfell and heads south bordering between both towns. It eventually borders between Bellville and Kuils River and borders between Delft and Blue Downs before intersecting with the N2 (Settlers Way) north of Mitchells Plain and Philippi. It then turns in a south-westerly direction between Mitchells Plain and Phillipi and ending at the intersection with the M7 (Jakes Gerwel Drive) in Mitchells Plain.

Interchanges

Peninsula Expressway 

The entirety of the R300 Freeway is part of the proposed Peninsula Expressway, which is to be designated as the N21 and is to be a toll road. This new national route is to include the current R300 Freeway as well as extensions at either end of that R300 Freeway.

The proposed road is meant to extend the current R300 from its northern terminus (Stellenberg Interchange) with the N1 Highway, past Durbanville, bending west, up to the Melkbosstrand and Bloubergstrand coastal area. It is also meant to extend the current R300 from its southern terminus (Mitchells Plain) junction with the M7 Route (Jakes Gerwel Drive) westwards, through Zeekoevlei, up to the Muizenberg and Westlake area.

In August 2022 the Western Cape Department of Transport and Public Works announced the launch of an environmental impact assessment for the extension of the R300 from its current terminus at the N1 northwards to the R302 (Wellington Road).

References

External links
 Routes Travel Info

Regional Routes in the Western Cape
Roads in Cape Town
Highways in South Africa